Forbes' renia (also known as Renia  discoloralis, since it has not been formally described yet) is a moth of the family Noctuidae. It is found in the United States from the Delaware Bay region of New Jersey, southward into Gulf states.

There are two generations per year in most of its range.

The larvae feed on organic matter, including dead leaves.

References

Herminiinae
Undescribed arthropod species